Isola Maggiore is the second largest island (at approximately ) on Lake Trasimeno, in Umbria, central Italy. It is a frazione of the comune of Tuoro sul Trasimeno, and is the only inhabited island on the lake, with a current population of 35.

History
St Francis of Assisi lived 40 days on this island as a hermit during Lent (probably 1211 although the date is unsure). The 12th century Church of Saint Michael the Archangel was built on the top of the hill.

The island's only town reached its height in the 14th century, after the establishment of a Franciscan Monastery in 1328.  Most of the towns buildings date from this period.

By the 1800s the town had a population of 700 and was in decline.

The Guglielmi Castle was built in the 1880s on the site of the monastery, but has since fallen into disrepair.  The castle was in the process of being turned into a luxury resort and spa, but in 2010 the company declared bankruptcy.

From the end of February 1944 until 18 June 1944 the castle was used as an internment camp for Jews and political prisoners, sent there for their own safety by the Fascist Prefect of Perugia Armando Rocchi, who was under German instructions to send them instead to a concentration camp at Fosssoli, Carpi di Modena.  After the Fascist authorities left Perugia and the British arrived at Sant'Arcangelo on 19 June the prisoners were eventually rowed to safety by the island's fishermen, to whom a monument has been erected in the open space next to the Lace Museum.  The rescue was organised by the island's priest, don Ottavio Posta.

Economy
Today the town is dependent on fishing, agriculture, tourism and traditional Irish lace making which was introduced in the 1900s. Some of the olive trees on the island are hundreds of years old.

Visitors can explore the old town and hill; paths cross the island through the olive groves.

References 

Frazioni of the Province of Perugia
Landforms of Umbria
Islands of the Trasimeno Lake
Lake islands of Italy